Maximiliano Gómez Horacio "El Moreno" (May 5, 1943 – May 23, 1971) was the leader of the Maoist Movimiento Popular Dominicano (MPD), a militant organization opposed to the Joaquín Balaguer government and to U.S. presence in the Dominican Republic. Commended by some, repudiated by others, the controversial figure of Maximiliano Gomez is part of the political heritage of the Dominican Republic. He oriented his limited efforts during a short period of time to battle Joaquin Balaguer's regime. Maximiliano Gomez was killed by poison by his lover-many claim that she did so by orders of Balaguer-and in turn she was found killed and dismembered, possibly by the same people who ordered her to poison Maximiliano Gomez.

References

External links
 Wiki Dominicana

1943 births
1971 deaths
Dominican Republic politicians
Dominican Republic revolutionaries
20th-century rebels
Dominican Republic rebels